Storm Alex was a powerful early-season extratropical cyclone that was particularly notable for its extreme flooding around the Mediterranean. Alex caused widespread wind and flooding damage across Europe, and at least 16 fatalities, with one more 1 person missing. Alex was the first named storm in the 2020–21 European windstorm season.

Originally, a minor low-pressure system to the south west of Greenland late on 27 September. This pressure system tracked south eastwards, experiencing the Fujiwhara effect and then undergoing explosive cyclogenesis before making landfall in Brittany on 1 October. It was named by AEMET and Météo-France on 30 September, with Red warnings being issued for wind for parts of Northern France from 16:00 CET on 1 October.

The storm led to advection of Mediterranean air northwards where it interacted with the coastal topography producing an extremely heavy rainfall in southeast France, known as a "Mediterranean Episode". This brought record breaking flooding and devastation to many areas in the region.

The flooding in the south of France was purportedly the worst for at least 120 years, when records began.

Preparations and impact

United Kingdom
Many warnings were issued for the storm by UK Met Office. The first being issued for 30 September for heavy rain across south west Scotland. This was a yellow warning, stating the possibility of localised flooding. Further warnings were issued in the following days. Daily rainfall records were broken for many places. The highest fall reported as of 21:00 BST, the Met Office reported the maximum rainfall total to be  at Liss, Hampshire, with the maximum gust of  being recorded at Berry Head, Devon.

Warnings

France

Departments in the south of France were particularly badly affected, with record breaking flooding and landslides. At least 5 people died.

See also
Storm Gloria (2020)
Storm Ciara (2020)
Storm Dennis (2020)

References

External links 
 Eumetsat Case Study

2020 meteorology
2020 natural disasters
Weather events in the United Kingdom
Alex
2020 disasters in the United Kingdom
2020 in Ireland
February 2020 events in Europe
February 2020 events in the United Kingdom
Floods in Ireland
Weather events in Ireland
Storms
Floods in the United Kingdom